Lathyrus sulphureus is a species of wild pea known by the common names snub pea and sulphur pea.

It is native to the mountains of northern California and Oregon, where it grows in forest and woodland.

Description
Lathyrus sulphureus is a hairless perennial herb with leaves made up of many oval-shaped leaflets each up to 4 centimeters long. The leaves are tipped with branching, coiled tendrils and the large stipules may be over 2 centimeters long.

The plant produces a dense inflorescence of up to 15 pea flowers which are often arranged in a line down one side of the stem. The flowers are light yellow to deep orange and darken as they age. They are wide and have deeply folded faces.

The fruit is a hairless dehiscent legume pod.

References

External links

 Calflora Database:  Lathyrus sulphureus (Brewer's pea,  Snub pea, Sulpher pea)
 Jepson Manual eFlora  (TJM2) treatment of Lathyrus sulphureus
USDA Plants Profile for Lathyrus sulphureus
UC CalPhotos gallery: Lathyrus sulphureus

sulphur
Flora of California
Flora of Oregon
Flora of the Sierra Nevada (United States)
Natural history of the California chaparral and woodlands
Natural history of the California Coast Ranges
Flora without expected TNC conservation status